Kasper Faust Henriksen (born 11 March 1986) is a Danish male badminton player. In 2005, he won gold medal at the European Junior Badminton Championships in boys' doubles event with his partner Rasmus Bonde. In 2010, he won the bronze medal at the European Badminton Championships in men's doubles event with his partner Anders Kristiansen.

Achievements

European Championships
Men's doubles

European Junior Championships
Boys' doubles

BWF International Challenge/Series
Men's doubles

Mixed doubles

 BWF International Challenge tournament
 BWF International Series tournament
 BWF Future Series tournament

References

External links 

Living people
1986 births
Danish male badminton players